Stuart Hooper (born 16 June 1970) is an English former professional footballer who played in the Football League as a forward.

References

1970 births
Living people
People from Lytham St Annes
English footballers
Association football forwards
Burnley F.C. players
English Football League players